The Passing may refer to:
 The Passing (1983 film), a 1983 American science fiction film
 The Passing (2015 film), a 2015 British drama film
 "The Passing", a DLC campaign in the 2009 video game Left 4 Dead 2
 "The Passing", a song by Lamb of God from their 2009 album Wrath

See also
 Pass (disambiguation)
 Passing (disambiguation)